Harry Stillwell Edwards (1855–1938) was an American journalist, novelist, and poet, born at Macon, Georgia. He studied law at Mercer University, Macon, and graduated in 1877. He was assistant editor and editor of Macon journals (1881–1888), gaining distinction as a writer of dialect stories. He wrote on the Georgia aristocracy as well as pro-slavery fantasies popular in the South.  Amongst his publications are:  
 Two Runaways and Other Stories (1889)
 The Marbeau Cousins (1898)
 Sons and Fathers (1896)
 His Defense and Other Stories (1899)
 Eneas Africanus (1920)

References

External links
 
 
 

19th-century American novelists
American male journalists
1855 births
1938 deaths
Mercer University alumni
20th-century American novelists
American male novelists
19th-century American male writers
20th-century American male writers
20th-century American non-fiction writers
Members of the American Academy of Arts and Letters